The Googleplex is the corporate headquarters complex of Google and its parent company, Alphabet Inc. It is located at 1600 Amphitheatre Parkway in Mountain View, California.

"Googleplex" is a portmanteau of Google and complex (meaning a complex of buildings) and a reference to googolplex, the name given to the large number 10(10100), or 10googol.

Facilities and history

The original campus

SGI Campus
The site was previously occupied by Silicon Graphics (SGI). The office space and corporate campus is located within a larger  site that contains Charleston Park, a  public park; improved access to Permanente Creek; and public roads that connect the corporate site to Shoreline Park and the Bay Trail. The project, launched in 1994, was built on the site of one of the few working farms in the area and was city owned at the time (identified as "Farmer's Field" in the planning documents). It was a creative collaboration between SGI, StUDIOS Architecture, SWA Group, and the Planning and Community Development Agency of the City of Mountain View. The objective was to develop in complementary fashion the privately owned corporate headquarters and adjoining public greenspace. Key design decisions placed parking for nearly 2000 cars underground, enabling SWA to integrate the two open spaces with water features, shallow pools, fountains, pathways, and plazas. The project was completed in 1997. The ASLA noted that the SGI project was a significant departure from typical corporate campuses, challenging conventional thinking about private and public space and awarded the project the ASLA Centennial Medallion in 1999.

Architecture was the architect for the original SGI campus and provided both interior architecture and base building design.

Google campus

The former SGI facilities were leased by Google beginning in 2003. A redesign of the interiors was completed by Clive Wilkinson Architects in 2005.
In June 2006, Google purchased some of Silicon Graphics' properties, including the Googleplex, for $319 million.

Since the buildings are of relatively low height, the complex sprawls out over a large area of land. The interior of the headquarters is furnished with items like shade lamps and giant rubber balls. The lobby  contains a piano and a projection of current live Google search queries. Facilities include free laundry rooms (Buildings 40, 42 & CL3), two small swimming pools, multiple sand volleyball courts,a bowing alley, massage rooms, organic gardens and eighteen cafeterias with diverse menus. Google has also installed replicas of SpaceShipOne and a dinosaur skeleton.

Since 2007 the site has featured a series of solar panels covering the rooftops of eight buildings and two solar carports, and capable of producing 1.6 megawatts of electricity. At the time of installation, Google believed it to be the largest in the United States among corporations. The panels provide the power needed for 30% of the peak electricity demand in their solar-powered buildings.
Four 100kW Bloom Energy Servers were shipped to Google in July 2008, making Google the first customer of Bloom Energy.

The Android lawn statues (previously outside of Building 44 on Charleston Road), are now located on the Google campus at 1981 Landings Drive (at ), and include a giant green statue of the Android logo and additional statues to represent all the versions of the Android operating system.

Bay View addition

In 2013 construction began on a new  campus dubbed "Bay View", adjoining the original campus on  leased from the NASA Ames Research Center and overlooking San Francisco Bay at Moffett Federal Airfield. The estimated cost of the project was $120 million with a target opening date of 2015.

NBBJ was the architect and this was the first time Google has designed its own buildings rather than moving into buildings occupied by previous businesses.

The addition is off the northeast corner of the complex, by the Stevens Creek Nature Study Area/Shoreline Park. Before announcing the construction, Google, through its in-house real estate firm, Planetary Ventures, sought permission from the city of Mountain View to build bridges over the adjacent Stevens Creek. Google's 2012 year-end annual report noted it can develop only  of the  site.

Google planned in 2015 a  addition designed by Heatherwick Studio and Bjarke Ingels in North Bayshore. The site, however, was granted to LinkedIn by the city councilors and the Google project was revised in 2016, with 3 buildings to be built on 2 different sites east of Googleplex in Mountain View; one immediately next to Googleplex and the two smaller ones a few blocks away.

Location 

The Googleplex is located between Charleston Road, Amphitheatre Parkway, and Shoreline Boulevard in north Mountain View, California close to the Shoreline Park wetlands. Employees living in San Francisco, the East Bay, or South Bay may take a free Wi-Fi-enabled Google shuttle to and from work. The shuttles are powered by a fuel blend of 95% petroleum diesel and 5% biodiesel and have the latest emissions reduction technology.

To the north lies the Shoreline Amphitheatre and Intuit, and to the south lies Microsoft Corporation's Silicon Valley research complex, the Computer History Museum, and Century Theatres. Moffett Field lies nearby to the east.

Other Google Mountain View locations

Google in its 2012-year-end annual report said it had 3.5 million square feet of office space in Mountain View.

In 2013, Google leased the entire Mayfield Mall, an enclosed shopping mall that last operated in 1984 and was leased by Hewlett-Packard from 1986 to 2002.

It has a "burbling fountain out front and rows of company-issued bikes, which employees use to shuttle to the main campus."

In popular culture

The Googleplex was featured in the 2013 film The Internship, with the Georgia Tech campus standing in as a double, because Google doesn't allow filming on the campus grounds for privacy reasons. It was also the inspiration for the fictional Hooli headquarters in the HBO TV series Silicon Valley.

See also

 Android lawn statues
Planet Google (book)
The Internship (2013 film)

References

External links 

Life in the Googleplex 2006 Photo Essay from Time magazine
Googleplex East: Inside Google's New York City Headquarters , from Information Week

Biking around Googleplex on Kinomap
Andrew Norman Wilson's Viral Video "Workers Leaving the Googleplex"

1997 establishments in California
Buildings and structures in Mountain View, California
Corporate headquarters in Silicon Valley
Google real estate
Information technology company headquarters in the United States
Multi-building developments in the United States
Office buildings completed in 1997
Office buildings in California